Vohburg (Central Bavarian: Vohbuag an da Doana) is a town in the district of Pfaffenhofen, in Bavaria, Germany. It is situated on the right bank of the Danube, 14 km east of Ingolstadt.

Famous persons 
Bertha of Vohburg
Diepold III of Vohburg

References

Pfaffenhofen (district)